Phillaur is a city and a municipal council as well as a tehsil in Jalandhar district in the Indian state of Punjab.The city is situated 20 km from Ludhiana , 70 km from Jalandhar  and 140 km from Amritsar . Situated on Doaba and Puadh regions Border . Phillaur is in Doaba region

Overview 

Phillaur is the railway junction on the border line of Ludhiana Main and Ludhiana Cantonment (older spelling: Ludhiana).  It was a junction for Lohian Khas and Ferozepur.  In pre-partition days, it was the main timber market of Punjab Region.  It is situated on the banks of River Satluj, the southernmost of the five rivers of the Punjab region.  The timber cut in higher regions of Shivalik range was thrown into the River Satluj and then collected at Phillaur for further transportation. The dedicated railway line survives to this day but it is not functional.  The town stands on the highway of traditional Grant Trunk Road (G. T. Road or Sher Suri Marg, now National Highway 1 - NH. 1).  The actual G. T. Road passes through Phillaur.  The older path of actual G. T. Road still survives along the railway bridge which  Ludhiana.

This town was named by a Sanghera Jatt called Phul who named it earlier is Phulnagar.  However the Naru Rajputs, sent by Rai Shahr, occupied this town when Shahr's son Ratan Pal left Mau and settled in Phillaur.
During Sher Shah Suri times (1540-1545 A. D.), a Sarai (for trading and military purpose) was raised at Phillaur.  The Sarai was again revived by Mughal Emperor Shahjahan (1627-1657 A. D.) and used as Postal Center (Dak ghar) and Military camp.  After the Treaty of Amritsar of 1809 between Ranjit Singh and the British East India Company, it became the border post of the Sikh Empire of Ranjit Singh.  It was kept under Raja Dhanpat Rai who also acted as his munshi for the lands across the River Sutluj which fell in Ludhiana (made military cantonment by British in 1842). The Sarai was converted into a fort as an outpost. Presently, the fort is called Ranjit Singh Fort. It is now being used as Police Training Academy (PTA). The Finger Print Bureau (1892) in police academy is one of the oldest institution in the region. It is also the birthplace of the famous Pakistani poet Sher Muhammad Khan, better known by his pen name, Ibn-e-Insha.

Geography 
It has an average elevation of 234 metres (767 feet).

Demographics 
 India census, Phillaur had a population of 178,198. Males constitute 54% of the population and females 46%. Phillaur has an average literacy rate of 83.16%, higher than state average of 75.84 %. male literacy is 87.07%, and female literacy is 78.88%. In Phillaur, 11% of the population is under 6 years of age.

Composition of Jai Jagdish Hare 

The popular Hindu hymn, Jai Jagdish Hare was composed by a local scholar Shardha Ram Phillauri from Phillaur some time in the 1870s. The exact date is not known. Shardha Ram Phillauri also wrote what is generally considered to the first novel in Hindi. There is a memorial commemorating him.

Villages in Phillaur Tehsil
UPPAL BHUPA

References

External links 
 

Cities and towns in Jalandhar district